Luca is a 2019 Indian Malayalam-language drama film directed by Arun Bose and produced by Linto Thomas and Prince Hussain under the studio Stories & Thoughts Productions. The film is co-written by Mridul George and stars Tovino Thomas and Ahaana Krishna in lead roles. Debutantes Nimish Ravi and Nikhil Venu handles the cinematography and editing departments respectively. Sooraj S. Kurup is the music director.

Plot
The film starts off with an unexpected event that sets in motion an investigation by police officer Akbar. A diary that Akbar reads takes the audience through the lives of Luca and Niharika, with the diary playing the role of a storyteller.

Luca is a talented scrap artist with a very small circle of friends. Luca does not know how to control his anger and he expresses them in violent streaks when something irritates him. The film is set against the backdrop of Kochi Biennale and Luca locks horns with Niharika when she passes simple remarks about his installation. She later seeks his forgiveness and moves into his home as a paying guest and from there develops a very close relationship and an encompassing love. He had mental problems after his mother's passing away and still has fear of anything that is related to death (Necrophobia), and partly arts were a distraction from these aspects. Niharika after knowing this takes on the role of a calming figure for him when he simmers with anger and becomes his guiding strength ready to brave every storm that threatens them to any ‘end’. Whenever Luca has panic attacks about death-related matters, Niharika becomes his comfort. Niharika was abused in her childhood by a close relative and that has left a permanent emotional scar. Luca becomes the loving force that fills her emptiness.

Their dreamy world shatters when Luca is diagnosed with stage four cancer. After coming to knows this Luca's and Niharika relationship get strained as Luca is being more worried about his death and Niharika is breaking down to see his condition which affects him more by seeing her tears. So two weeks before his demise, Luca send Niharika to Bangalore, her home town. During investigation it becomes known that Niharika killed herself through oral poisoning a week before Luca's death and sent a diary to Luca before her last breath, which Akbar was reading. Akbar, going through the chain of events in Luca's and Niha's begone lives, begins to be affected. Akbar was fighting his own demons with a prior failed relationship and at an impending divorce with his wife Fathima. Luca's and Niharika's romantic story changes him at some point, while he solves his case. As Akbar couldn't find the final piece of his case i.e. how Luca died. He was thinking about the same and as a friendly conversation he conveys the Story of Luca and Niharika to Fathima for which she give her opinion that in the whole world Only it's Niharika's wish to make Luca's death without pain and ease. This Strikes Akbar's Mind and  it is later revealed that Niha being a chemistry student makes a poison herself after going back to Bangalore and applies poison in her diary which Luca longed to read. Luca had a habit of turning pages with the help of saliva keeping this in mind Niha did so. She couriers this diary to him, which he read the way she had imagined and he died peacefully without any pain or discomfort; thereby protecting him from all the worldly pains by going to an extreme extent, as she had mentioned to him previously .

In the climax of movie it shown that Fathima tearing the Akbar's ex lover photo indicates that he is ready to move forward by forgetting all his past and Friends of Luca enter to his home with the key he given to them long ago.

Cast

 Tovino Thomas as Luca
 Ahaana Krishna as Niharika Banerjee a.k.a. Niha
Hansika Krishna as young Niharika
 Nithin George as Akbar Hussein
 Anwar Shereef as Aloshi
 Neethu Bala as Jannet
Rajesh Sharma as Sivan Ashan
Vinitha Koshy as Fathima
Sooraj S Kurup as Sooraj
 Shalu Rahim as Rohan
 Chembil Ashokan as Martin
Devi Ajith as Forensic surgeon
Jaffer Idukki as Antony
Neena Kurup as Adv. Amala
Pauly Valsan as Salomi
Srikanth Murali as Jayaprakash
 Thalaivasal Vijay as Police officer Jayaraman
 Raghavan as Doctor

Production
Luca was announced by Tovino Thomas on 17 September 2017. It is the feature film directorial debut of filmmaker Arun Bose and scripted by Mridul George and Arun Bose. The film is produced by Linto Thomas and Prince Hussain under their production house Stories & Thoughts Productions. Gokul Nath G is the executive producer. According to the posters that have come out, Tovino Thomas is said to play an artist. Production will be controlled by Job George, while Remya Suresh will handle the costumes department, the art director is Anees Nadody, Nimish Ravi is the cinematographer and Sooraj S. Kurup will compose the songs. The editing work is done by Nikhil Venu and The Sound Design is done by Joby Sony Thomas and Prasanth PM.

Soundtrack

The soundtrack for Luca was composed by Sooraj S. Kurup. Song released under Muzik247 official label

Release 
Luca was released on 28 June 2019. A Telugu version of the film titled Luca Alias Johnny was released on the streaming service Aha.

Reception
Luca's fear of death, love, and suicide romanticism received mixed reviews from critics. Baradwaj Rangan of Film Companion South wrote "But even if Luca never becomes the Great Love Story the makers were trying for, it's an easy watch. The sensuality of the imagery has an almost tactile quality. Mere technique cannot make a movie, but it can make us believe that a movie like Luca is better than it really is."

References

External links
 
 

2010s Malayalam-language films
Films shot in Kochi
2019 films
Films scored by Sooraj S. Kurup